The 1937–38 Divizia B was the fourth season of the second tier of the Romanian football league system.

The format has been maintained, but this time both series had 12 teams, instead of 13. Also it was decided to reduce Divizia A to a single series of 12 teams, so only the winners of the Divizia B series promoted.

Team changes

To Divizia B
Promoted from Divizia C
 Tricolor Baia Mare
 Telefon Club București
 UD Reșița
 SG Sibiu
 Hatmanul Luca Arbore Rădăuți
 Gloria CFR Galați
 Prahova Ploiești

Relegated from Divizia A
 —

From Divizia B
Relegated to Divizia C
 —

Promoted to Divizia A
 Sportul Studențesc
 Phoenix Baia Mare
 CFR Brașov
 Jiul Petroșani
 Dacia Unirea IG Brăila
 Vulturii Textila Lugoj
 Dragoș Vodă Cernăuți
 Olimpia CFR Satu Mare

Disqualified teams
 IAR Brașov

League tables

Serie I

Serie II

See also 

 1937–38 Divizia A

References

Liga II seasons
Romania
2